Roman Valeryevich Udodov (born 28 November 1975) is a Russian professional football coach and a former player. He is an assistant coach with PFC Dynamo Stavropol.

Club career
He made his Russian Football National League debut for FC Mashuk-KMV Pyatigorsk on 26 March 2006 in a game against FC Dynamo Makhachkala. He also played in the FNL for Mashuk-KMV in 2007.

External links
 

1975 births
Sportspeople from Stavropol
Living people
Russian footballers
Association football forwards
FC Dynamo Stavropol players
FC Volgar Astrakhan players
FC Volga Nizhny Novgorod players
FC Armavir players
FC Mashuk-KMV Pyatigorsk players